Endozoicomonas euniceicola is a Gram-negative, facultatively anaerobic and rod-shaped bacterium from the genus of Endozoicomonas which has been isolated from the octocorals Eunicea fusca and Plexaura.

References

Oceanospirillales
Bacteria described in 2007